This list comprises all players who have participated in at least one league match for Kalamazoo Outrage since the team's first season in the USL Premier Development League in 2008 until their last in 2010. Players who were on the roster but never played a first team game are not listed; players who appeared for the team in other competitions (US Open Cup, etc.) but never actually made an USL appearance are noted at the bottom of the page where appropriate.

A
  Chris Adrian
  Eric Alexander
  Terry Alvino

B
  Domenic Barone
  Mark Barone
  Phil Boerger
  Mark Briggs
  Eric Brodfuehrer
  C. J. Brown
  Nathan Bruinsma
  Dan Bulley

C
  Jeremy Clark
  Anthony Colaizzi
  Chase Corricelli
  Baker Cronin

D
  Rafael Dantas
  Christopher Darby
  Luigi Djokic

E
  Scott Ellis

F
  Keenan Flynn
  Jordan Fylonenko

G
  Colin Givens
  Stewart Givens
  Kieron Gradwell
  Timothy Granaderos

H
  Benny Hanaphy
  Aaron Henkle
  Casey Higgason
  Mitch Hildebrandt
  T.J. Howard

I
  Imad Id-Deen

J
  Daniel Jackson
  Eric Johnson

K
  Christoph Kaesler
  Stephen Kauble
  Adam Keller
  Daniel Kelly

L
  Luis Lemus
  Marcelo Lima
  Robby Lynch
  Shane Lyons

M
  Alan McGreal
  Troy Mellanson
  Adam Mena
  Lance Muckey
  Yahaya Musa

N
  Luke Norman
  Nate Norman

O
  Tom Oatley

P
  David Parato

R
  Doug Raak
  David Reed
  Matt Reindl
  Kevin Reiman
  Stu Riddle
  Brent Rosendall
  Tyler Rosenhagen
  Jon Rzepka

S
  Justin Sass
  Matt Schmitt
  Nathan Schmitt
  Blake Schneider
  Charles Schwartz
  Bobby Shuttleworth
  Mahamadou Simpara
  Dustin Snyder
  Heath Somers
  Matt Stedman
  Marco Stencel
  Dan Stevens
  Noble Sullivan

T
  Nathan Thackeray
  Ryan Thelen

V
  Blaine Veldhuis
  Kyle VondenBenken

W
  Wade Wadsworth
  Tom Warmer
  Charlie Watts
  Stefan Wolf
  David Wood

Sources
 
 2010 Kalamazoo Outrage stats
 2009 Kalamazoo Outrage stats
 2008 Kalamazoo Outrage stats

References

Kalamazoo Outrage
 
Association football player non-biographical articles